Lakshman Chandra Seth (born 11 April 1946), commonly known as Lakshman Seth, is an Indian politician from Tamluk, West Bengal, India. He was a West Bengal state committee member of the CPIM and is a former MP from Haldia.

He was expelled from the Communist Party of India (Marxist). In 2016, Seth joined the Bharatiya Janata Party and merged Bharat Nirman Party of his own which was floated by him after his expulsion from the CPI(M). He was expelled from BJP in 2018 and fought 2019 election from Tamluk constituency with congress ticket.

References

External links
 Official biographical sketch in Parliament of India website

1946 births
Living people
Communist Party of India (Marxist) politicians from West Bengal
Bharatiya Janata Party politicians from West Bengal
India MPs 2004–2009
Lok Sabha members from West Bengal
Members of the West Bengal Legislative Assembly
People from Tamluk
India MPs 1999–2004
India MPs 1998–1999
People from Purba Medinipur district